The 1979-80 LSU Tigers men's basketball team represented Louisiana State University during the 1979–80 NCAA men's college basketball season. The head coach was Dale Brown. The team was a member of the Southeastern Conference and played their home games at the LSU Assembly Center.

Roster

Schedule

|-
!colspan=6 style=| Regular season

|-
!colspan=12 style=|SEC tournament

|-
!colspan=12 style=|NCAA Tournament

Rankings

Team players drafted into the NBA

References 

LSU Tigers basketball seasons
Lsu
Lsu
LSU
LSU